Alaska.de is a 2000 German drama film directed by Esther Gronenborn.

References

External links 

2000 drama films
German drama films
2000 films
2000s German-language films
2000s German films